The  is a  Kofun period burial mound, located in the Nishisho neighborhood of the town of Higashimiyoshi, Tokushima on the island of Shikoku in Japan. It was designated a National Historic Site of Japan in 1977.

Overview
The Tanda Kofun is located on a ridge of 460-meter Mount Kamo, on the south bank of the middle reaches of the Yoshino River in western Tokushima Prefecture. The tumulus was originally believed to be an ancient sutra mound and had a small chapel to Kūkai on its summit. It was found to be an ancient kofun by the town's cultural properties committee in 1958. It is unusual in that the tumulus is a pile of crystalline schist stone rubble, with no soil used in its construction. It has a total length of 37 meters, orientated to the west. The burial chamber is a pit-type stone chamber in the posterior circular portion, and measures 4.51 meters in length, 1.3 meters in width (eastern end), 1.28 meters (western end), and 1.2 meters in height. An archaeological excavation was conducted in 1969 by Doshisha University, and grave goods, including one bronze mirror,  an iron sword and an iron ax, form the early Kofun period were found. A group of pit dwellings from the end of the Yayoi period was found at the nearby Kamo Higashihara site, and it is presumed that the village was involved in the construction of the Tanda Kofun.

The tumulus is about 15 minutes by car from Awa-Kamo Station on the JR Shikoku Tokushima Line.  

Overall length 37 meters
Posterior circular portion 17.5 meter diameter x 3 meters high 
Anterior rectangular portion 6.6 meters wide x 1 meter high 
 Connecting restriction 10 meters wide

See also
List of Historic Sites of Japan (Tokushima)

References

External links
Higashimiyoshi Town home page 
Tokushima Prefecture home page 

History of Tokushima Prefecture
Higashimiyoshi, Tokushima
Historic Sites of Japan
Archaeological sites in Japan
Kofun